The Alberta Central Railway Museum is a railway museum located south-east of the City of Wetaskiwin, in Central Alberta, Canada.  The main building was designed as a scaled-down version of the City's 1907 Canadian Pacific Railway depot. The depot includes a waiting room, baggage room and telegraph office, as well as exhibits and railroad artifacts. Railroad equipment includes locomotives, a sleeper car, passenger coach, freight equipment, cabooses, freight cars and a snowplough. Attractions include a model train layout of the original Wetaskiwin railyard. The museum also features a 1906 Alberta Grain Co. grain elevator which was moved from Hobbema. The elevator is known to be Alberta's second-oldest grain elevator in the Province. Rides are given on a one-mile loop of track.

See also
List of museums in Alberta

References

External links

Alberta Central Railroad Museum

Railway station museums in Alberta
Grain elevator museums in Alberta
Wetaskiwin